Audrey Cordon-Ragot (née Cordon; born 22 September 1989) is a French road bicycle racer, who rides for UCI Women's WorldTeam .

Career
She competed at the 2012 Summer Olympics in the Women's road race, but finished over the time limit. In the Women's time trial she finished 15th.

In 2013, Cordon won the general classification of the five-day Tour de Bretagne Féminin.

In October 2014, it was announced that Cordon-Ragot would join the  team in 2015 as a super-domestique, following her fellow  rider Elisa Longo Borghini to the British-based squad.

In 2015 and 2016 she won the French National Time Trial Championships.

She also competed at the 2016 Summer Olympics in Rio de Janeiro. In the Women's road race she finished 37th, in the Women's time trial she finished 24th.

In 2017 she won the mountains classification jersey of the Women's Tour.

In September 2022, Cordon-Ragot announced via Twitter that she would not compete with the French national team at the 2022 UCI Road World Championships in Australia as expected, due to health reasons; in a later press release, it was announced that Cordon-Ragot had suffered a stroke.

Having spent four seasons with the  team, Cordon-Ragot was scheduled to join a newly-setup B&B Hotels women's team for the 2023 season.

Personal life
On 10 October 2014 she married cyclist Vincent Ragot.

Major results
Source: 

2007
 3rd Calan Criterium
 4th Time trial, UEC European Junior Road Championships
2008
 2nd  Team pursuit, UEC European Under-23 Track Championships (with Elodie Henriette & Pascale Jeuland)
 3rd Individual pursuit, National Track Championships
 3rd Route Féminine Du Vignoble Nantais
 3rd Lesneven Criterium
2009
 2nd Road race, Brittany Regional Road Championships
 10th Chrono Champenois
2010
 1st Road race, West Interregional Road Championships
 1st Road race, Brittany Regional Road Championships
 1st Duo Normand (with Emmanuelle Merlot)
 1st Calan Criterium
 1st Stage 2 (TTT) Ronde de Bourgogne
 1st Stage 2 (ITT) Tour de Charente-Maritime
 3rd Grand Prix de France
2011
 1st Road race, Brittany Regional Road Championships
 1st Calan Criterium
 Ronde de Bourgogne
1st Stages 2 (TTT) & 3
 1st Stage 1 Tour de Charente-Maritime
 2nd Road race, West Interregional Road Championships
 2nd Duo Normand (with Emmanuelle Merlot)
 3rd Time trial, National Road Championships
 5th Time trial, UEC European Under-23 Road Championships
 8th Cholet Pays de Loire Dames
2012
 1st Road race, West Interregional Road Championships
 1st Cholet Pays de Loire Dames
 1st Crac'h Criterium
 1st Calan Criterium
 1st Grand Prix de Plumelec-Morbihan Dames
 1st Classic Féminine Vienne Poitou-Charentes
 2nd Time trial, National Road Championships
 3rd Road race, Brittany Regional Road Championships
 3rd Grand Prix Fémin'Ain
 3rd Wanze Criterium
 6th Overall Tour de Bretagne Féminin
 10th Overall Gracia-Orlová
2013
 1st Road race, Brittany Regional Road Championships
 1st  Overall Tour de Bretagne Féminin
 1st Classic Féminine Vienne Poitou-Charentes
 1st Crac'h Criterium
 1st Saint-Gildas-de-Rhuys Criterium
 1st Hennebont Criterium
 2nd Time trial, National Road Championships
 2nd Cholet Pays de Loire Dames
 4th Road race, Jeux de la Francophonie
2014
 1st Grand Prix de Plumelec-Morbihan Dames
 2nd Overall Tour de Bretagne Féminin
1st  Points classification
1st Stage 4
 3rd Omloop van het Hageland
 4th Overall La Route de France
1st Stage 5
 5th Cholet Pays de Loire Dames
 6th Chrono Champenois-Trophée Européen
2015
 National Road Championships
1st  Time trial
2nd Road race
 1st Road race, Brittany Regional Road Championships
 1st Cholet Pays de Loire
 5th La Classique Morbihan
 5th Grand Prix de Plumelec-Morbihan Dames
2016
 National Road Championships
1st  Time trial
3rd Road race
 5th Time trial, UEC European Road Championships
 6th Grand Prix de Plumelec-Morbihan Dames
 10th Durango-Durango Emakumeen Saria
2017
 1st  Time trial, National Road Championships
 1st Time trial, Brittany Regional Road Championships
 1st Chrono des Nations
 1st  Mountains classification The Women's Tour
 4th Grand Prix de Plumelec-Morbihan Dames
 6th La Classique Morbihan
2018
 1st  Time trial, National Road Championships
 3rd Overall Madrid Challenge by La Vuelta
 3rd Chrono des Nations
 4th Time trial, UEC European Road Championships
 4th Cadel Evans Great Ocean Road Race
 6th Amstel Gold Race
 6th Tour of Guangxi
 10th Omloop Het Nieuwsblad
 10th Kreiz Breizh Elites Dames
2019
 1st  Overall Tour de Bretagne Féminin
1st  Brittany rider classification
 1st Acht van Westerveld
 1st Postnord UCI WWT Vårgårda West Sweden TTT
 2nd Time trial, National Road Championships
 3rd Overall Belgium Tour
2020
 National Road Championships
1st  Road race
2nd Time trial
 1st Stage 3 Tour Cycliste Féminin International de l'Ardèche
 1st Stage 1 (TTT) Giro Rosa
 UEC European Road Championships
5th Road race
10th Time trial
2021
 National Road Championships
1st  Time trial
2nd Road race
 8th Donostia San Sebastián Klasikoa
 8th Paris–Roubaix
2022
 National Road Championships
1st  Road race
1st  Time trial
 1st Postnord Vårgårda WestSweden
 1st Postnord Vårgårda WestSweden TTT
 2nd Overall Holland Ladies Tour
1st Stage 5 (ITT)
 3rd Overall BeNe Ladies Tour
 4th Time trial, UEC European Road Championships
 10th GP de Plouay

References

External links

 
 
 
 
 
 
 
 

1989 births
Living people
People from Pontivy
French female cyclists
Olympic cyclists of France
Cyclists at the 2012 Summer Olympics
Cyclists at the 2016 Summer Olympics
Sportspeople from Morbihan
Cyclists from Brittany
20th-century French women
21st-century French women